Joseph Martin Boever (born October 4, 1960) is an American former professional baseball right-handed relief pitcher who played in Major League Baseball (MLB) from  to  for the St. Louis Cardinals, Atlanta Braves, Philadelphia Phillies, Houston Astros, Oakland Athletics, Detroit Tigers, and Pittsburgh Pirates.

Early career
Boever pitched for Lindbergh High School in St. Louis, graduating in 1979. He pitched for three colleges, one of which was UNLV, before being signed as an undrafted free agent by the St. Louis Cardinals on June 25, 1982.

Major league reliever
Boever made his major league debut for the St. Louis Cardinals on July 19, 1985, and would go on to appear in 24 games over the next two seasons.

On July 24, 1987, Boever was traded to the Atlanta Braves for pitcher Randy O'Neal.

A career reliever, Boever was most notable for throwing a palmball pitch. Nicknamed "Boever The Saver", he was a closer for the 1989 Atlanta Braves, collecting 21 saves. In 1992, he led the league in appearances for a pitcher, playing in 81 games for the Houston Astros. Boever retired in 1997.

See also
 Houston Astros award winners and league leaders

References

External links

1960 births
Living people
American expatriate baseball players in Canada
Arkansas Travelers players
Atlanta Braves players
Baseball players from Missouri
Calgary Cannons players
Carolina Mudcats players
Detroit Tigers players
Edmonton Trappers players
Erie Cardinals players
Houston Astros players
Louisville Redbirds players
Major League Baseball pitchers
Oakland Athletics players
People from Kirkwood, Missouri
Philadelphia Phillies players
Pittsburgh Pirates players
Richmond Braves players
Sportspeople from St. Louis County, Missouri
Springfield Cardinals players
St. Louis Cardinals players
St. Petersburg Cardinals players
UNLV Rebels baseball players